Ian Hughes may refer to:

 Ian Hughes (Australian footballer) (1939–1976), Australian rules footballer
 Ian Hughes (diplomat) (born 1951), British diplomat
 Ian Hughes (footballer, born 1946), Welsh footballer
 Ian Hughes (footballer, born 1974), Welsh footballer
 Ian Hughes (footballer, born 1961), English footballer for Sunderland
 Ian Hughes (epredator) (born 1967), British technology evangelist and television personality
 Ian Hughes (rugby league) (born 1972), rugby league footballer of the 1990s and 2000s

See also 
 Hughes (surname)